The Bureau of Jail Management and Penology is an attached agency of the Department of the Interior and Local Government mandated to direct, supervise and control the administration and operation of all district, city and municipal jails in the Philippines with pronged tasks of safekeeping and development of its inmates, officially classed as persons deprived of liberty (PDL).

History
It was created on January 2, 1991, by virtue of Republic Act No. 6975 also known as the Department of the Interior and Local Government Act of 1990. Prior to its creation, the Office of Jail Management and Penology of then Philippine Constabulary - Integrated National Police was the agency handling the local penology of the Philippines. It aimed to separate the agency from the national police, reporting directly to the Secretary of the Interior and Local Government.

Operations
The Jail Bureau, pursuant to Section 60 to 65, Chapter V, Republic Act No. 6975 amended by Republic Act No. 9263 (Bureau of Fire Protection and Bureau of Jail Management and Penology Professionalization Act of 2004), is headed by a Chief who is assisted by two Deputy Chiefs, one for Administration and another for Operations, and one Chief of Directorial Staff, all of whom are appointed by the President upon the recommendation of the Secretary of the Interior and Local Government from among the qualified officers with the rank of at least Senior Superintendent in the Jail Bureau. The Chief of the Jail Bureau carries the rank of Director and serves a tour of duty that must not exceed four years, unless extended by the President in times of war and other national emergencies.

The Jail Bureau operates and maintains Regional Offices in each of the administrative regions of the country, headed by a Regional Director for Jail Management and Penology, with the rank of at least Senior Superintendent. The Regional Director is assisted by an Assistant Regional Director for Administration, Assistant Regional Director for Operations, and Regional Chief of Directorial Staff, who are all officers with the rank of at least Superintendent.

In every province, the Jail Bureau operates and maintains a Provincial Jail Administrator's Office headed by a Provincial Administrator, who oversee the implementation of jail services of all district, city and municipal jails within its territorial jurisdiction. In large cities or a group of clustered municipalities, a District Jail headed by a District Warden may be established. The City and Municipal Jails, each headed by a City or Municipal Warden.

Command structure

 The president of the Philippines as Commander-in-Chief
 The secretary of the Interior and Local Government
 The Chief, Bureau of Jail Management and Penology (C, BJMP)
 The Deputy Chief for Administration (TDCA)
 The Deputy Chief for Operations (TDCO)
 The Chief Directorial Staff (TDCS)

Leadership
Commander-in-Chief: President Bongbong Marcos
Secretary of the Interior and Local Government (SILG): Benjamin C. Abalos Jr.
Chief, Bureau of Jail Management and Penology (C, BJMP): Jail Dir. Allan S. Iral, CESE
Undersecretary for Peace and Order, DILG: Oscar F. Valenzuela
The Deputy Chief for Administraion (TDCA): JCSUPT. Ruel S. Rivera, DSC
The Deputy Chief for Operations (TDCO): JCSUPT. Dennis U. Rocamora, CESE
The Chief, BJMP Directorial Staff (TCDS): JCSUPT. Paulino H. Moreno Jr.

Organization

National Headquarters
3. Office of the Chief, BJMP
4. Office of the Deputy Chief for Administration
5. Office of the Deputy Chief for Operations
6. BJMP Directorial Staff
7. Office of the Secretary to the Command Group

Directorates
 Directorate for Personnel and Records Management 
 Directorate for Human Resource Development
 Directorate for Operations 
 Directorate for Welfare and Development
 Directorate for Logistics 
 Directorate for Comptrollership 
 Directorate for Program and Development 
 Directorate for Information and Communications Technology Management
 Directorate for Intelligence
 Directorate for Investigation and Prosecution
 Directorate for Health Services

Support Services

 Finance Service Office 
 Chaplaincy Service Office
 Community Relations Service Office
 Accounting Office
 Legal Service Office
 Headquarters Support Service Office
 Supply Accountable Office-BJMP Wide
 Office of the National Executive Senior Jail Officer
 Legislative Liaison Office
 National Jail Management and Penology Training Institute
 Preventing and Countering Violent Extremism Center 
 Retirement and Separation Benefits Administration Service Office 
 Jail Service Intelligence Operations Center 
 Internal Audit Unit
 Center for Jail Excellence and Strategy Management

Special Tactics and Response Team (BJMP - STAR) 
An elite unit of BJMP specialized in responding to incident that require tactical response, as well as transporting high value Person Deprived of Liberty (PDL).

References

External links

 Official Website
 Republic Act No. 6975 from the LawPhil Project
 Republic Act No. 6975 from the LawPhil Project

Law enforcement in the Philippines
Prison and correctional agencies
Penal system in the Philippines
Department of the Interior and Local Government (Philippines)